Drew Milne is a contemporary British poet and academic.

Published works 
Milne’s books of poetry include Sheet Mettle (Alfred David Editions, 1994), Bench Marks (Alfred David Editions, 1998), The Damage: new and selected poems (Salt, 2001), Mars Disarmed (The Figures, 2002), and Go Figure (Salt, 2003). His work is also featured in collections and anthologies, notably Conductors of Chaos, edited by Iain Sinclair (Picador, 1996) and Anthology of Twentieth-Century British and Irish Poetry edited by Keith Tuma (Oxford University Press, 2001). He edits the occasional journal Parataxis: modernism and modern writing and the poetry imprint Parataxis Editions. He co-edited Marxist Literary Theory: A Reader (Blackwell, 1996) with Terry Eagleton, and has edited the anthology Modern Critical Thought (Blackwell, 2003).  He published 'Agoraphobic Poetics: Essays on Contemporary Poetry (Salt, 2009), and his collected poems, In Darkest Capital, were published by Carcanet in 2017.

See also

 British Poetry Revival

 Further reading 
 Andrew Jordan, Review of Parataxis 10.
 David Kennedy, Review of The Damage, Poetry Review Volume 92, No 2 (Summer 2002).
 Tony Lopez, On Drew Milne, Keston Sutherland and Andrea Brady, Stand Magazine Volume 1(4) (December 1999).
 Drew Milne, Agoraphobic Poetics: Essays on Contemporary Poetry (Salt 2009).
 Drew Milne, "Pinter's sexual politics" in The Cambridge Companion to Harold Pinter, ed. Peter Raby (Cambridge University Press, 2001), pp. 195–211.
 Drew Milne, "Between Philosophy and Critical Theory: Marcuse", The Edinburgh Encyclopædia of Continental Philosophy, ed. Simon Glendinning (Edinburgh: Edinburgh University Press, 1999), pp. 461–470.
 Drew Milne, "Marxist Literary Theory after Derrida", Common Sense 19 (1996), pp. 5–19.
 Drew Milne, "Beyond new historicism: Marlowe's unnatural histories and the melancholy properties of the stage", The Glasgow Review, 1 (1993), 79-91.
 Drew Milne, "Agoraphobia and the embarrassment of manifestoes: notes towards a community of risk", Parataxis, 3 (1993), 25-40.
 Drew Milne and Allen Fisher, "Exchange in Process", Parataxis, 6 (1994), 28-36, and 8 (1996), 47-8.
 Drew Milne and J.H. Prynne, "Some Letters", Parataxis, 5 (1993-4), 56-62.
 Drew Milne, "Cottage Industries and Agoraphobia revisited: further notes on risk", Parataxis, 4 (1993), 58-69.
 Drew Milne, Farmiliars (Equipage, 1999).
 Drew Milne, "Eva Hesse" in Art without Art: Selected Writing from the World of Blunt Edge'', ed. Marcus Reichert (Ziggurat Books 2008), pp. 55–60.

References

External links 
 Parataxis
 Archive of the Now
 Drew Milne at PennSound
 Drew Milne at Salt Publishing

Scottish poets
Living people
Year of birth missing (living people)